Hommell was a French Automobile manufacturer, started in 1990 by Michel Hommell, a former racing driver and the owner of Échappement, a French car magazine. The company is based in Lohéac, near Rennes, Brittany. A prototype of the kind of sports car he would like to be produced was shown at the 1990 Paris Salon, where it was well received, encouraging him to go ahead with a production version. This was shown at the 1994 Geneva Motor Show.  The 2 seat sports coupe is powered by a mid-mounted 2.0lt Peugeot engine and 6 speed gearbox in a tubular steel chassis with all-round independent suspension.

In 1998, the Barquette, an open-top version was announced, and at the same time the Berlinette RS, as the original model was now called, had a more powerful Citroën engine fitted.

The brand has produced three models under the direction of Gilles Dupré:
 In 1994
 Berlinette Échappement
Engine: 1998 cc in-line 4-cylinder DOHC 16-valve 
Power:  @ 6500 rpm
Torque:  @ 3500 rpm
Weight: 
Top Speed: 
Barquette
Engine: 1998 cc in-line 4-cylinder DOHC 16-valve 
Power:  @ 6500 rpm
Torque:  @ 5500 rpm
Weight: 
Top Speed: 
In 1999
Berlinette RS coupé
Engine: 1998 cc in-line 4-cylinder DOHC 16-valve 
Power:  @ 6500 rpm
Torque:  @ 5500 rpm
Weight: 
Top Speed: 
In 2001
Berlinette RS2
Engine: 1998 cc in-line 4-cylinder DOHC 16-valve 
Power:  @ 6750 rpm
Torque:  @ 5500 rpm
Weight: 
Top Speed: 

In December 2003, the production was stopped for financial reasons.

In 2005, Chinese investors wanted to buy the plans for the Berlinetta Hommell to be produced near Shanghai for the local market, but no agreement was reached.

References

External links
Michel Hommell's Manoir de l'Automobile

Car manufacturers of France
Sports car manufacturers
French brands